The Wedding Guest can refer to:

 The Wedding Guest (1916 film), an American silent film
 The Wedding Guest (2018 film), a British-American action thriller